The United Kingdom was represented in the Eurovision Song Contest 1983 by Sweet Dreams with the song "I'm Never Giving Up". It was chosen as the British entry through the A Song for Europe national selection process and placed sixth at Eurovision, receiving 79 points.

Before Eurovision

A Song for Europe 1983 
The television show A Song for Europe was used once again to select the British entry, as it had since the United Kingdom's debut at the Contest in 1957.

Competing entries 
Of the entries, songwriters Tony Hiller, Martin Lee and Paul Curtis had had songs in the Eurovision final before. Stephanie De Sykes and Stuart Slater had twice won the A Song for Europe contest previously, in both 1978 and 1980. Songwriter Marty Kristian had competed with the New Seekers in 1972. His group featured former New Seekers singer Kathy Ann Rae and former entrant Lance Aston (of Prima Donna). "When the Kissing Stops", written by Martin Lee and Barry Upton of Brotherhood of Man together with their longtime writing partner Tony Hiller (who had co-written "Save Your Kisses For Me" with Lee), was originally intended for the group themselves, but they decided it would be best not to risk losing and thus not to take part; although all four members of the group attended the broadcast. The group did go on to record the song however and it featured on their album Lightning Flash. The writers of "Keeping Our Love Alive", Doug Flett and Guy Fletcher had written many previous UK finalists, including the 1973 winner "Power to All Our Friends". The group Casablanca were short lived, but the three main artists, Des Dyer, Samantha Spencer-Lane and Carla Donnelly all featured in other editions of the UK final.

Final 
The final was held on 24 March 1983 at the Television Theatre in London, and was hosted by Terry Wogan. The BBC Concert Orchestra under the direction of John Coleman as conductor accompanied all the songs, but all the music was pre-recorded. Prior to the voting, a dance and song montage filmed at the Royal Mint was played featuring the song Money (That's What I Want). The votes of eight regional juries based in Cardiff, Belfast, Norwich, Glasgow, Bristol, Birmingham, Manchester and London decided the winner. Each jury region awarded 15 points to their favourite song, 12 points to the second, 10 points to the third and then 9, 8, 7, 6 and 5 points in order of preference for the songs from 4th to 8th.

UK Discography 
Sweet Dreams - I'm Never Giving Up: Ariola ARO333 (7" Single)/AROD333 (12" Single)/AROPD333 (7" Picture Disc).
Sam Childs - I'm Going Home: Trident Records (Test pressing only. Not released).
Stuart Slater - All Around The World: Chrysalis RAT1.
Casablanca - With Love: RCA RCA324.
Suzanne Michaels - With Love: CNR 145084.
Mirror - We've Got All The Time In The World: Magnet MAG242.
Audio - Love On Your Mind: Rex EURO1.
Rubic - When The Kissing Stops: Epic A3243.
Brotherhood of Man - When The Kissing Stops: EMI EMI5396.
Ritzy - Keeping Our Love Alive: Chrysalis RITZY1.

At Eurovision
After Bardo's "One Step Further" in the 1982 Eurovision Song Contest, the United Kingdom placed one spot better at sixth place, scoring 79 points, with "I'm Never Giving Up" by Sweet Dreams.

Terry Wogan provided the television commentary for BBC 1, additionally Wogan also provided commentary for viewers in Ireland and Australia for RTÉ 1 and SBS via the BBC. Due to the contest being held on St. George's Day, BBC Radio 2 opted not to broadcast the contest as they had already made plans to broadcast The St. George's Day Concert held at the same time. Colin Berry returned as spokesperson for the UK jury.

Voting

References 

1983
Countries in the Eurovision Song Contest 1983
Eurovision
Eurovision